Buffalo Springfield is a career retrospective album by the 1960s folk rock band of the same name, released in 2001.  Band member Neil Young assembled the tracks in chronological order to show how the band evolved and disintegrated in the span of two years, as encompassed through the first three CDs, while the fourth disc contains the band's first two albums, all but three tracks of which had already appeared in identical versions elsewhere on the first three discs. The box set reached number 194 on Billboard's Top 200 album chart, and stayed on the chart for one week.

Track listing
CD 1
"There Goes My Babe" (Neil Young) – 1:43 (previously unreleased demo)*
"Come On" (Stephen Stills) – 1:23 (previously unreleased demo)*
"Hello, I've Returned" (Stills, Van Dyke Parks) – 1:34 (previously unreleased demo)*
"Out of My Mind" (Young) – 2:44 (previously unreleased demo)*
"Flying on the Ground Is Wrong" (Young) – 3:08 (previously unreleased demo)*
"I'm Your Kind of Guy" (Young) – 1:05 (previously unreleased demo)*
"Baby Don't Scold Me" (Stills) – 2:04 (previously unreleased demo)*
"Neighbor Don't You Worry" (Stills) – 2:28 (previously unreleased demo)*
"We'll See" (Stills) – 4:07 (previously unreleased demo)*
"Sad Memory" (Richie Furay) – 2:49 (previously unreleased demo)*
"Can't Keep Me Down" (Furay) – 2:07 (previously unreleased demo)*
"Nowadays Clancy Can't Even Sing" (Young) – 3:25
"Go and Say Goodbye" (Stills) – 2:21
"Sit Down, I Think I Love You" (Stills) – 2:31
"Leave" (Stills) – 2:43
"Hot Dusty Roads" (Stills) – 2:51
"Everybody's Wrong" (Stills) – 2:24
"Burned" (Young) – 2:16
"Do I Have to Come Right Out and Say It" (Young) – 3:02
"Out of My Mind" (Young) – 3:05
"Pay the Price" (Stills) – 2:37
"Down Down Down" (Young) – 2:11 (previously unreleased demo)*
"Flying on the Ground Is Wrong" (Young) – 2:40
"Neighbor Don't You Worry" (Stills) – 2:25 (previously unreleased remix)*

CD 2
"Down Down Down" (Young) – 2:42 (previously unreleased remix)*
"Kahuna Sunset" (Stills, Young) – 2:53 (previously unreleased)*
"Buffalo Stomp (Raga)" (Furay, Bruce Kunkel, Dewey Martin, Stills, Young) – 3:51 (previously unreleased)*
"Baby Don't Scold Me" (Stills) – 3:24 (previously unreleased version)*
"For What It's Worth" (Stills) – 2:39 (previously unreleased version)*
"Mr. Soul" (Young) – 2:44 (previously unreleased version)*
"We'll See" (Stills) – 2:43 (previously unreleased)*
"My Kind of Love" (Furay) – 2:31 (previously unreleased)*
"Pretty Girl Why" (Stills) – 2:26 (previously unreleased mix)*
"Words I Must Say" (Furay) – 1:12 (previously unreleased demo)*
"Nobody's Fool" (Furay) – 1:31 (previously unreleased demo)*
"So You've Got a Lover" (Stills) – 3:06 (previously unreleased demo)*
"My Angel" (Stills) – 3:48 (Demo)*
"No Sun Today" (Eric Eisner) – 2:02 (previously unreleased)*
"Everydays" (Stills) – 2:40
"Down to the Wire" (Young) – 2:25 (previously unreleased version)*
"Bluebird" (Stills) – 4:29
"Expecting to Fly" (Young) – 3:45
"Hung Upside Down" (Stills) – 4:26 (previously unreleased demo)*
"A Child's Claim to Fame" (Furay) – 2:10
"Rock & Roll Woman" (Stills) – 2:46

CD 3
"Hung Upside Down" (Stills) – 3:27
"Good Time Boy" (Furay) – 2:15
"One More Sign" (Young) – 2:02 (previously unreleased demo)*
"The Rent Is Always Due" (Young) – 3:03 (previously unreleased demo)*
"Round and Round and Round" (Young) – 3:37 (previously unreleased demo)*
"Old Laughing Lady" (Young) – 2:40 (previously unreleased demo)*
"Broken Arrow" (Young) – 6:14
"Sad Memory" (Furay) – 3:01
"On the Way Home" (Young) – 2:27 (previously unreleased mix)*
"Whatever Happened to Saturday Night" (Young) – 2:06 (previously unreleased/remix)*
"Special Care" (Stills) – 3:32
"Falcon Lake (Ash on the Floor)" (Young) – 4:19 (previously unreleased/remix)*
"What a Day" (Furay) – 2:18  (previously unreleased)*
"I Am a Child" (Young) – 2:20
"Questions" (Stills) – 2:54
"Merry-Go-Round" (Furay) – 2:02
"Uno Mundo" (Stills) – 2:00
"Kind Woman" (Furay) – 4:12
"It's So Hard to Wait" (Furay, Young) – 2:05
"Four Days Gone" (Stills) – 3:47 (previously unreleased demo)*

CD 4
"For What It's Worth" (Stills) – 2:39
"Go and Say Goodbye" (Stills) – 2:21 (already on CD1, tk13)
"Sit Down, I Think I Love You" (Stills) – 2:32 (already on CD1, tk14)
"Nowadays Clancy Can't Even Sing" (Young) – 3:25 (already on CD1, tk12)
"Hot Dusty Roads" (Stills) – 2:50 (already on CD1, tk16)
"Everybody's Wrong" (Stills) – 2:24 (already on CD1, tk17)
"Flying on the Ground Is Wrong" (Young) – 2:40 (already on CD1, tk23)
"Burned" (Young) – 2:16 (already on CD1, tk18)
"Do I Have to Come Right Out and Say It" (Young) – 3:02 (already on CD1, tk19)
"Leave" (Stills) – 2:43 (already on CD1, tk15)
"Out of My Mind" (Young) – 3:05 (already on CD1, tk20)
"Pay the Price" (Stills) – 2:36 (already on CD1, tk21)
"Baby Don't Scold Me" (Stills) – 3:04
"Mr. Soul" (Young) – 2:49
"A Child's Claim to Fame" (Furay) – 2:10 (already on CD2, tk20)
"Everydays" (Stills) – 2:40 (already on CD2, tk15)
"Expecting to Fly" (Young) – 3:44 (already on CD2, tk18)
"Bluebird" (Stills) – 2:16 (already on CD2, tk17)
"Hung Upside Down" (Stills) – 3:27 (already on CD3, tk1)
"Sad Memory" (Furay) – 3:01 (already on CD3, tk8)
"Good Time Boy" (Furay) – 2:15 (already on CD3, tk2)
"Rock & Roll Woman" (Stills) – 2:46 (already on CD2, tk21)
"Broken Arrow" (Young) – 6:14 (already on CD3, tk7)

Personnel
Buffalo Springfield:
Richie Furay – guitar, vocals, backing vocals, producer
Dewey Martin – clarinet, drums, horn, saxophone, vocals, executive producer
Jim Messina – bass, producer, engineer
Bruce Palmer – bass
Stephen Stills – organ, bass, guitar, percussion, piano, electric piano, tambourine, vocals, backing vocals, hand clapping, producer, remixing
Neil Young – guitar, harmonica, piano, arranger, vocals, backing vocals, producer, remixing

Others:
Joel Bernstein – artwork, compilation, photography, research, text
Hal Blaine – drums
Don Blake – mixing
Bruce Botnick – engineer
William E. Brittan – engineer
Gary Burden – art direction, design
James Burton – dobro
Jimmy Karstein – drums
Charlie Chin – banjo
Merry Clayton – choir, chorus
David Crosby - backing vocal on "Rock & Roll Woman"
Richard Davis – bass
Ahmet Ertegun – producer
Cyrus Faryar – percussion
Jim Fielder – bass
James Gordon – strings, English horn
Jim Gordon – drums, timpani, vibraphone
Charles Greene – producer
Doug Hastings - guitar
Jessie Hill – drums, timpani
Jim Hilton – engineer
Brenda Holloway – choir, chorus
Patrice Holloway – choir, chorus
Jim Horn – clarinet
Carol Kaye – banjo, bass, dobro, fiddle, piano, strings, drums, horn, vibraphone
Bill Lazarus – engineer	
Gary Marker – bass
Sherlie Matthews – choir, chorus
Tom May – engineer
Buddy Miles – drums
Tim Mulligan – remixing
Harvey Newmark – bass
Gracia Nitzsche – choir, chorus
Jack Nitzsche – arranger, electric piano, producer
Don Randi – organ, piano, harpsichord
Mac Rebennack – piano
Stan Ross – engineer
Doc Siegel – engineer
 Armin Steiner – engineer
Brian Stone – producer
Jeromy Stuart – calliope, harpsichord, bells
Bruce Tergesen – engineer
Russ Titelman – guitar
Bobby West – bass
Rusty Young – Pedal Steel

References

Buffalo Springfield compilation albums
Rhino Records compilation albums
2001 compilation albums
Albums produced by Charles Greene (producer)
Albums produced by Brian Stone